Qinornis is a prehistoric bird genus from the early-mid-Paleocene epoch (late Danian age), about 61 million years ago. It is known from a single fossil specimen consisting of a partial hind limb and foot, which was found in Fangou Formation deposits in Luonan County, China.

The bones show uniquely primitive characteristics for its age, and its describer considered that it was either a juvenile of a modern bird group or, if an adult, the only known non-neornithine bird to have survived the Cretaceous–Paleogene extinction event. Unusually for such a recent bird, the bones of the foot are not completely fused to one another. This characteristic is found in juvenile modern birds, and in adults of more primitive, non-neornithean ornithurine birds, all of which were assumed to have become extinct in the Cretaceous–Paleogene extinction event, despite a sparse late-Maastrichtian fossil record limited primarily to North America. In 2007, Mayr examined the bones and concluded that they represented an adult, and probably did come from a non-neornithine bird similar to Apsaravis.

Longrich and colleagues (2011) doubted this assessment, noting that there is the possibility that the bones belonged to a juvenile, but also noted that it was not impossible for some "archaic" birds to have persisted beyond the Cretaceous period for some time, and that this did not invalidate the hypothesis that birds experienced a mass extinction event at the end of the Mesozoic.

References

Bird genera
Paleocene birds
Prehistoric animals of China
Fossil taxa described in 1995